Western Springs most commonly refers to:

Locations
Western Springs, Illinois, a suburb of Chicago
Western Springs station, a train station in Western Springs
Western Springs Water Tower, a museum and former water tower in Western Springs
Western Springs (Auckland suburb), a suburb of Auckland
Western Springs College, a secondary school located within Western Springs
Western Springs Reserve, a major park located within Western Springs
Western Springs Stadium, a venue located within Western Springs

Sports teams
Western Springs AFC, a football club in Auckland, New Zealand